Melissa Maria Petrén (born 18 January 1995) is a Swedish handballer for Viborg HK and the Swedish national team.

Achievements 
EHF Youth European Championship:
Gold Medalist: 2013

Individual awards
Swedish Elitserien Breakthrough of the Year: 2017
All-Star Left Wing of the Swedish Elitserien: 2017

References

External links

1995 births
Living people
People from Huddinge Municipality
Swedish female handball players
Lugi HF players
Expatriate handball players
Swedish expatriate sportspeople in Denmark
Handball players at the 2020 Summer Olympics
Olympic handball players of Sweden
Sportspeople from Stockholm County